Ponta Bicuda is a headland in the northern part of the island of Santiago, Cape Verde. In the 1747 map by Jacques-Nicolas Bellin, the point was mentioned as "Pt. Bikkude".

References

Headlands of Cape Verde
Geography of Santiago, Cape Verde
Tarrafal Municipality